Passage in Time is a compilation album by the Canadian melodic death metal band Quo Vadis and was released in 2001 by Skyscraper Music. It contains their entire 1995 Demo, a rerecorded version of Vital Signs, a remixed version of the Hunted, and two live songs recorded at Foufounes Electriques in Montreal and the music video for Dysgenics.

Track listing

Personnel
Arie Itman – vocals, guitar, violin, solo on track 4
Bart Frydrychowicz – guitar, vocals, solo on track 5 and 7
Remy Beaucahmp– bass, backing vocals
Yanic Bercier – drums, backing vocals

Quo Vadis (band) albums
2001 compilation albums